St. Paul African Methodist Episcopal Church is a historic African Methodist Episcopal church in Fayetteville, Tennessee, United States, located at 521 W. College Street.

The congregation was established as the "African Church" in 1824, probably by white slave-owners wanting to provide a Christian church for their household servants.

The church moved to its present location on West College Street in 1867. The church's current brick building was completed in 1913. Oral histories indicate that the women of the church delivered brick to the site by carrying bricks in their aprons. When built, the church facade featured three large circular windows; after a fire damaged the building, the circular windows were replaced by rectangular double-hung windows.

The church building was added to the National Register of Historic Places in 2003 following research by Middle Tennessee State University.

References

External links
 St. Paul African Methodist Episcopal Church (Fayetteville), Walker Library Digital Collections, Middle Tennessee State University

African Methodist Episcopal churches in Tennessee
Buildings and structures in Lincoln County, Tennessee
Churches on the National Register of Historic Places in Tennessee
National Register of Historic Places in Lincoln County, Tennessee